Immini Nalloraal is a 2005 Malayalam film directed by Rajasenan. This film stars Jayasurya, Navya Nair, Janardhanan and Bindu Panicker.

Plot
Sneha is a popular actress. Jeevan is a junior artist who is attracted to her. Sneha goes to Jeevan's village for the shoot. Jeevan and Sneha marry at the shooting. Jeevan thinks he tells his father he married with Sneha in a dream. One day while shooting, Jeevan kidnaps Sneha and takes her to an unknown location. Sneha's family and her colleagues try to negotiate with Jeevan for Sneha's return, but Jeevan does not want to return Sneha. Jeevan gets very annoyed.

Sneha Meets Jeevan in hospital. After a few days of keeping her as a hostage, Jeevan decides to give her back and surrender. He confesses that he took Sneha as a hostage because he saw her suicide note in her diary. Sneha understands the true love he has for her and saves him from the charges that were awaiting him. Finally they marry and transform from a reel- to a real-life couple.

Cast
 Jayasurya as Jeevan
 Navya Nair as Sneha
 Janardhanan as Bhaskara Pillai
 Bindu Panicker as Vishalam
 Kochu Preman as Barbar
 Siddique as Dr. Issac
 Madhu Warrier as Rahul
 Cochin Haneefa as Sub Inspector
 Salim Kumar as Kittunni
 Subair as Police Officer
 Kannur Vasutty as Director
 Kamal as himself

Soundtrack
"Komalavalli" - Vijay Yesudas, Jyotsna Radhakrishnan
"Koottukaare" - Jyotsna Radhakrishnan, Rajesh Vijay
"Onnu Kaanuvaan (Duet)" - Sujatha, Santhosh Keshav
"Onnu Kaanuvaan (Female)" - Sujatha
"Thattana Muttana" - Afsal

References

External links

2000s Malayalam-language films
Films directed by Rajasenan
Films scored by M. Jayachandran